Élvis Alves Pereira (born 23 August 1977, in São Paulo), is a Brazilian footballer who plays as a defender for Segunda Liga side Desportivo das Aves.

External links
 

1977 births
Living people
Footballers from São Paulo
Association football defenders
Brazilian footballers
Campeonato Brasileiro Série A players
Associação Portuguesa de Desportos players
Goiás Esporte Clube players
Clube de Regatas Brasil players
União Agrícola Barbarense Futebol Clube players
Primeira Liga players
Leixões S.C. players
C.D. Feirense players
C.D. Trofense players
C.D. Aves players
Brazilian expatriate footballers
Expatriate footballers in Portugal